They Made Me a Fugitive (released in the United States as I Became a Criminal) is a 1947 British film noir set in postwar England.

Based on the Jackson Budd novel A Convict Has Escaped, the black-and-white film was directed by Alberto Cavalcanti (credited as just Cavalcanti), with brooding and atmospheric cinematography by noted cameraman Otto Heller. The script was written by playwright Noel Langley.

Plot
Clem Morgan, demobilised from the Royal Air Force and unemployed after the war, helps in the stealing and transporting of black market goods in coffins to crime boss Narcy's (short for Narcissus) headquarters in a funeral parlour. Clem finds the activity harmless enough, until one day he finds drugs in the latest coffin. Clem objects and tells his girlfriend, Ellie, that he will quit after one last job that night, the looting of a warehouse. Narcy betrays him, triggering the burglar alarm while he is inside. Clem manages to get back in the car with Narcy and another member of the gang, Soapy, before they drive off. When Narcy orders Soapy to run down a policeman, Clem grabs the wheel in an unsuccessful attempt to save the man's life and the car crashes into a lamppost. Narcy knocks him unconscious and has him moved to the driver's seat before fleeing with Soapy. Inspector Rockliffe arrives on the scene with other police officers to find the police officer dead and Clem injured in the car.

Clem is convicted of manslaughter and sentenced to fifteen years in prison in HM Prison Dartmoor. Sally Connor, Narcy's girlfriend, visits him in prison, telling him that Narcy is now with Ellie (who has not visited Morgan in prison) and that she knows he was framed as she was told so by Cora, Soapy's girlfriend. Sally offers to try to persuade Soapy to give evidence but Clem tells her to go away.

Back in London, Sally tells Cora that she has seen Clem and wants to go and speak to Soapy to get him to tell the police what really happened, but Narcy has found out that Sally has gone to see Clem in prison and brutally beats her up.

Clem escapes from prison and the police start a manhunt for him. He seeks shelter in a remote farmhouse, where Mrs. Fenshaw lets him bathe, shave and change his clothes, and also cooks him some food. Mr. Fenshaw comes into the room, but turns out to be a hopeless drunk who is hardly aware of his surroundings. Mrs. Fenshaw then tries to get Clem to shoot her husband, stating that as he is already a murderer it won't make any difference to him. Clem refuses and leaves, but he has handled the gun, leaving his fingerprints on it, and Mrs. Fenshaw uses it to shoot her husband dead.

Clem is now wanted for the murder of Mr. Fenshaw as well, but makes his way back to London and goes to stay with Sally; he then manages to escape both the police and Narcy, but Sally is kidnapped by Narcy and his gang and taken to their hideout, where Cora is already being held. Cora is forced to tell Narcy where Soapy is hiding out (in a room in a rundown hotel nearby) and Narcy sends Jim to go and kill Soapy, which he does.

Clem, whilst trying to find Cora and Soapy, is caught by Rockliffe, who tells him that he is not convinced by Mrs. Fenshaw's story, the first indication that the police might believe in Clem's innocence. In order to use him as bait, Rockliffe lets Clem go, and he goes to the Valhalla funeral parlour to meet with Narcy's gang. After knocking other members of the gang out, Clem and Narcy end up fighting on the roof of the parlour, before Narcy falls to the ground. Rockliffe, Sally and Clem gather round, begging Narcy, who is dying, to tell the truth about who killed the policeman but Narcy sticks to his story and repeats that it was Clem, before dying. Rockliffe leads Clem away, whilst Sally promises to wait for him. The ending is rather ambiguous, as Clem presumably has to return to prison, and he is also facing a possible murder charge; all that Rockliffe can do is promise to look at any new evidence that comes up.

Cast
 Trevor Howard as Clem Morgan 
 Sally Gray as Sally 
 Griffith Jones as Narcy
 Rene Ray as Cora
 Mary Merrall as Aggie
 Ballard Berkeley as Inspector Rockliffe
 Charles Farrell as Curley
 Michael Brennan as Jim
 Jack McNaughton as Soapy
 Cyril Smith as Bert
 John Penrose as Shawney
 Eve Ashley as Ellen
 Vida Hope as Mrs. Fenshaw
 Maurice Denham as Mr. Fenshaw
 Sam Kydd as Eddie

Reception
According to trade papers, the film was a "notable box office attraction" at British cinemas in 1947.

Critical
"Artfully sculpted and suspenseful," wrote TV Guide, "THEY MADE ME A FUGITIVE makes for gripping, adult cinema."

References

External links
 
 
Review of film at Variety

1947 films
1947 crime drama films
British black-and-white films
British crime drama films
Film noir
Films directed by Alberto Cavalcanti
Films set in London
Films set in England
Films with screenplays by Noel Langley
Warner Bros. films
1940s British films
1940s English-language films